Shao Zengming  is a Chinese businessman and billionaire who founded synthetic diamond manufacturer Henan Liliang Diamond.

Forbes lists his net worth as of April 2022 at $1.1 billion USD.

References 

Chinese billionaires
Chinese company founders
20th-century Chinese businesspeople
21st-century Chinese businesspeople
Living people
Year of birth missing (living people)